Sonam Yoezer (born 24 October 1994) is a Bhutanese international footballer, currently playing for Thimphu City. He made his first appearance for Bhutan at the age of 18, in an SAFF Cup game against Sri Lanka on 6 September 2013.

Yoezer played for Yeedzin, moving to Ugyen Academy on 31 December 2013. He then joined Druk United on 30 June 2015. He played his first AFC Cup game for Thimphu City against Club Valencia on 7 July 2017.

References

External links

Sonam Yoezer at WorldFootball.com
Sonam Yoezer at SoccerPunter.com

1994 births
Living people
Bhutanese footballers
Bhutan international footballers
Association football midfielders
Yeedzin F.C. players